A whitening transformation or sphering transformation is a linear transformation that transforms a vector of random variables with a known covariance matrix into a set of new variables whose covariance is the identity matrix, meaning that they are uncorrelated and each have variance 1. The transformation is called "whitening" because it changes the input vector into a white noise vector.

Several other transformations are closely related to whitening:

 the decorrelation transform removes only the correlations but leaves variances intact,
 the standardization transform sets variances to 1 but leaves correlations intact, 
 a coloring transformation transforms a vector of white random variables into a random vector with a specified covariance matrix.

Definition 
Suppose  is a random (column) vector with non-singular covariance matrix  and mean . Then the transformation  with 
a whitening matrix  satisfying the condition  yields the whitened random vector  with unit diagonal covariance.

There are infinitely many possible whitening matrices  that all satisfy the above condition.

For example, the unique optimal whitening transformation achieving maximal component-wise correlation between original  and whitened  is produced by the whitening matrix   where  is the correlation matrix and  the variance matrix.

Whitening a data matrix 

Whitening a data matrix follows the same transformation as for random variables.  An empirical whitening transform is obtained by estimating the covariance (e.g. by maximum likelihood) and subsequently constructing a corresponding estimated whitening matrix (e.g. by Cholesky decomposition).

High-dimensional whitening 

This modality is a generalization of the pre-whitening procedure extended to more general spaces where  is usually assumed to be a random function or other random objects in a Hilbert space . The advantage of these whitening transformations is that they can be optimized according to the underlying topological properties of the data (smoothness, continuity and contiguity), thus producing more robust whitening representations. High-dimensional features of the data can be exploited through kernel regressors or basis function systems.

R implementation 

An implementation of several whitening procedures in R, including ZCA-whitening and PCA whitening but also CCA whitening, is available in the "whitening" R package   published on CRAN. The R package "pfica"   allows the computation of high-dimensional whitening representations using basis function systems (B-splines, Fourier basis, etc.).

See also
 Decorrelation
 Principal component analysis
 Weighted least squares
 Canonical correlation
 Mahalanobis distance (is Euclidean after W. transformation).

References

External links 
 http://courses.media.mit.edu/2010fall/mas622j/whiten.pdf
 The ZCA whitening transformation. Appendix A of Learning Multiple Layers of Features from Tiny Images by A. Krizhevsky.

Classification algorithms